Tetsuma Esaki (born September 17, 1943) is a Japanese politician of the Liberal Democratic Party (LDP), formerly a member of the House of Representatives in the Diet (national legislature). A native of Ichinomiya, Aichi and graduate of Rikkyo University, he was elected for the first time in 1993 as a member of the now-defunct Japan Renewal Party. He later joined the LDP. He was defeated in the 2009 by DPJ candidate Kazumi Sugimoto.

August 3, 2017, he served as Minister of State for Okinawa and Northern Territories Affairs, and Consumer Affairs and Food Safety. But February 27, 2018, He resigned from the minister due to a mild cerebral infarction. Next day, Teru Fukui, former vice Minister of Education, Culture, Sports, Science and Technology assumed office as a successor.

Remarks 

 On August 8, 2018, Esaki said that "the Japan-U.S. Status of Forces Agreement (SOFA) should be “re-examined” in light of the fatal crash off Australia of an Okinawa-based U.S. Marine Corps Osprey aircraft, likely overstepping Tokyo's official line on the politically sensitive pact."
 Masumi Esaki, Tetsuma's farther was a great politician. Masumi has served as Minister of Defense, Minister of Economy, Trade, and Industry, and Chairperson of the National Public Safety Commission.

References

External links 
 Official website in Japanese.

Members of the House of Representatives from Aichi Prefecture
Living people
1943 births
People from Ichinomiya, Aichi
Japan Renewal Party politicians
Liberal Democratic Party (Japan) politicians
Rikkyo University alumni
21st-century Japanese politicians